Reese McCall (born June 16, 1956) is a former American football tight end, who played eight seasons in the National Football League. He played college football at Auburn University.

1956 births
Living people
American football tight ends
Auburn Tigers football players
Players of American football from Alabama
Baltimore Colts players
Detroit Lions players
Sportspeople from Bessemer, Alabama